Robert James Brown  (2 December 1933 – 30 March 2022) was an Australian Labor Party politician.

Early life
Brown was born in Pelaw Main and educated at Pelaw Main Primary School, Kurri Kurri Junior Technical High School, Maitland Boys High School, the University of Sydney (B.Ec), Sydney Teachers' College (Dip.Ed), Broken Hill Technical College and the University of New England.  He married Elizabeth Joy Hirschausen in 1960 and had one daughter (Kelly Hoare) and one son.

Political career
Brown first contested the then safe Liberal seat of Paterson at the 1961 federal election. He gathered a 6.5% swing to Labor but failed to beat the sitting member and Menzies Government Minister, Allen Fairhall. Brown later contested and won the seat of Cessnock in the New South Wales Legislative Assembly and held it from 1978 to 1980.

He switched to federal politics, this time successfully contesting the nearby electorate of Hunter, holding it from 1980 until 1984. After a redistribution moved a large slice of Hunter to the new seat of Charlton, Brown transferred there and represented it from 1984 to 1998. He served as Minister for Land Transport from 1988 to 1993. He retired in 1998, and was succeeded in Charlton by his daughter, Kelly Hoare.

Honours
On 11 June 2007, Brown was named a Member of the Order of Australia for "service to the Australian Parliament, particularly in the area of transport policy, to the community of the Hunter Region through local government, heritage and sporting organisations, and to economics education."

Death
Brown died on 30 March 2022, aged 88. His funeral was held on 6 April 2022, a week after his death.

References

1933 births
2022 deaths
Members of the Australian House of Representatives for Hunter
Members of the Australian House of Representatives for Charlton
Members of the Australian House of Representatives
Members of the New South Wales Legislative Assembly
Members of the Order of Australia
Australian Labor Party members of the Parliament of Australia
20th-century Australian politicians
Government ministers of Australia
People from New South Wales